A curfew is an order specifying a time after which certain regulations apply.

Curfew may also refer to:
 Curfew (1925 film), a German silent drama film
 Curfew (1989 film), an American action/horror film directed by Gary Winick
 Curfew (1994 film), an Israeli drama film by Rashid Masharawi
 Curfew (2012 film), a short film directed by Shawn Christensen
 Curfew (TV series), a 2019 Sky One television series, starring Adam Brody, Billy Zane and Sean Bean
 Curfew (band), an English jazz fusion band
 "Curfew" (song), a 1993 song by Drive
 "Curfew", a song by The Stranglers from Black and White
 "Curfew", a song by Spratleys Japs
 The former name of Nightshift (magazine)
The Curfew (play), an 1807 work by John Tobin